The University Global Partnership Network (UGPN) is an international network of universities, established as a "foundation for international collaboration enabling academics and students from some of the world’s top universities to work together on issues of global importance".

The mission of UGPN is "to develop sustainable world-class research, education and knowledge transfer through an active international network of selected Universities collaborating in research, learning and teaching to benefit global society".

UGPN Member Institutions 
UGPN currently has 4 member universities in four countries.

Australia 
 University of Wollongong

Brazil 
 University of São Paulo

United Kingdom 
 University of Surrey

United States 
 North Carolina State University

Additional Partnership Relationships 
 Banco Santander
 Fapesp (the São Paulo State Research Funding Council)

References

External links 

International college and university associations and consortia